Josef Šebestián Daubek (24 December 1842, Polička – 15 July 1922, Liteň) was a Czech-Austrian nobleman, politician, entrepreneur and patron of the arts.

Biography
His father, was a well-known businessman and politician. His mother was the daughter of the poet, . He attended a Realschule in Prague, followed by a business and commercial education in Vienna; where he married Irma Welsová in 1884.

In 1873 he became a shareholder in the family's mills in Brněnec; becoming the owner in 1878.
This led to involvement in the distilling and brewing industry; interests which later passed to his son, Josef Daubek (1888–1934). Together with Karl Kruis (1851-1917), he established the first  distillery training school in Předlitavsko. In 1892, he became Chairman of the Association of Commercial Mills and was knighted in 1896.

In addition to his business interests, he was active in politics; serving three terms as the District Mayor in Polička (1874, 1890, 1893). For many years he served on the Municipal Council in Brněnec and the District Committee for Beroun.

Following a by-election in 1892, he became a member of the Bohemian Diet.

He was also a patron of the arts and formed a life-long friendship with the painter, František Ženíšek, whom he engaged to decorate his home in Liteň. Ženíšek later accompanied him on his honeymoon to Holland; painting the "official portrait" of the newlywed couple. Many other artists received significant support from him; including Josef Mánes, Quido Mánes, Josef Václav Myslbek and Antonín Wiehl.

References

External links 

1842 births
1922 deaths
Czech nobility
20th-century Czech businesspeople
Czech politicians
People from Polička
19th-century Czech businesspeople